In mathematics, specifically category theory, a family of generators (or family of separators) of a category  is a collection  of objects in , such that for any two distinct morphisms  in , that is with , there is some  in  and some morphism  such that  If the collection consists of a single object , we say it is a generator (or separator). 

Generators are central to the definition of Grothendieck categories.

The dual concept is called a cogenerator or coseparator.

Examples
 In the category of abelian groups, the group of integers  is a generator: If f and g are different, then there is an element , such that . Hence the map   suffices.
 Similarly, the one-point set is a generator for the category of sets. In fact, any nonempty set is a generator.
 In the category of sets, any set with at least two elements is a cogenerator.
 In the category of modules over a ring R, a generator in a finite direct sum with itself contains an isomorphic copy of R as a direct summand.  Consequently, a generator module is faithful, i.e. has zero annihilator.

References
 , p. 123, section V.7

External links
 

Category theory